The New Horizons 26 is an American trailerable sailboat that was designed by Sparkman & Stephens as a cruiser and first built in 1958. It was Sparkman & Stephens design #1235.

The New Horizons 26 was initially marketed as the New Horizons 25.

Production
The boat was introduced at the New York Boat Show in 1957 and 30 boats were sold at that show, marking it as an instant commercial success for the builder, Ray Greene & Company in Toledo, Ohio, United States. The design was built starting as a 1958 model and running until about 1966, with 175 boats were completed.

The boat was the first Sparkman & Stephens production design especially for construction in fiberglass, which was then a new material for boatbuilding. Green's company was an early adopter of fiberglass construction.

Design
The New Horizons 26 is a recreational keelboat, built predominantly of fiberglass, with wood trim. It has a masthead sloop rig, a raked stem, an angled transom, a keel-mounted rudder controlled by a tiller and a fixed, stub, modified long keel, the  retractable centerboard. It displaces  and carries  of ballast.

The boat was factory-fitted with a Universal Atomic 4  gasoline engine for docking and maneuvering, but could optionally be fitted with a small  outboard motor.

The boat was fitted with a molded fiberglass interior, one of the first boats to have this feature. The design has sleeping accommodation for four people, with a double "V"-berth in the bow cabin and two quarter berths under the cockpit. The galley is located on the starboard side just forward of the companionway ladder. The galley is equipped with a stove and a sink, with an ice box opposite, on the port side. The head is located amidships, on the port side.

Operational history
In a 2010 review Steve Henkel wrote, "She initially had reverse sheer ... but in about 1960 the sheer was flattened somewhat for aesthetic reasons. An unusual feature was a dinghy designed for the boat, to be carried on stern davits. When the larger but similar-looking Tartan 27, another S&S design, was introduced in 1961 (3 years after the New Horizons) for nearby Tartan (then known as Douglass & McLeod, in Grand River, OH), it quickly diverted customer interest from the Ray Greene boat, much to Greene's disgust. Best features: The good headroom (over six feet) is unusual for a 25-foot sailboat. We liked the idea of a dinghy in davits, too, but wonder whether it might have been ugly to look at. Worst features: We remember admiring the design of this boat when she first came out, but after owning a Tartan 27, we can see how prospective buyers would switch their allegiances to the Tartan."

See also
List of sailing boat types

References

Keelboats
1950s sailboat type designs
Sailing yachts
Trailer sailers
Sailboat type designs by Sparkman and Stephens
Sailboat types built by Ray Greene & Company